Jacques Celestin Songo'o (born 17 March 1964) is a Cameroonian former professional footballer who played as a goalkeeper, and is the current goalkeeper coach of the Cameroon national team.

He spent the vast majority of his professional career in France and Spain, most notably with Deportivo de La Coruña, appearing in more than 200 official games over the course of six seasons and winning the 1999–2000 La Liga. 

Songo'o represented the Cameroon national team in four World Cups, being first-choice in 1998.

Club career
Songo'o was born in Sackbayeme, in the Yaoundé suburbs. After first establishing himself as a professional in France, with Ligue 1 club FC Metz, he was voted Best African Goalkeeper in 1996, then arguably lived his most successful period at Spain's Deportivo de La Coruña.

With the Galicians, Songo'o won the 1996–97 edition of the Ricardo Zamora Trophy (awarded to the best goalkeeper of the season), and was his side's undisputed starter in his first four years, which ended with a first-ever title in La Liga. When Depor bought José Francisco Molina in 2000, he soon lost his place and was eventually transferred to old team Metz; on 13 February of that year, from a corner kick, he was supposed to have scored his first career goal, but it was wrongfully disallowed in a 1–0 away loss against CD Numancia.

After two seasons, Songo'o returned to Deportivo and A Coruña, again in a free transfer. He settled there after having retired from football, aged 40.

International career
Songo'o featured for Cameroon in every FIFA World Cup from 1990 to 2002, although only as first-choice in 1998. He was also a member of the squad that competed at the 1984 Summer Olympics in Los Angeles.

After retiring in 2004, Songo'o was hired as the national team's goalkeeper coach. He left the position in 2006, returning four years later as a replacement for Thomas N'Kono.

In the 2010 World Cup in South Africa, Songo'o was part of Paul Le Guen's coaching staff. After the tournament, which ended in the group stage, he led Cameroon to a 3–0 victory over Poland on an interim basis, the nation's first win in ten competitive games.

Songo'o returned for a third spell in the same capacity in September 2019, now under newly hired manager Toni Conceição.

Personal life
Songo'o also held French citizenship. Both of his sons, Franck and Yann, were also professional footballers.

Honours
Canon
Elite One: 1984–85, 1985–86
Cameroonian Cup: 1985–86

Metz
Coupe de la Ligue: 1995–96

Deportivo
La Liga: 1999–2000
Supercopa de España: 2000

Cameroon
Africa Cup of Nations: 1988, 2002

Individual
Ricardo Zamora Trophy: 1996–97

References

External links
 
 
 Deportivo archives
 
 

1964 births
Living people
French sportspeople of Cameroonian descent
Cameroonian footballers
Association football goalkeepers
Canon Yaoundé players
Ligue 1 players
Ligue 2 players
SC Toulon players
Le Mans FC players
FC Metz players
La Liga players
Deportivo de La Coruña players
Cameroon international footballers
1990 FIFA World Cup players
1994 FIFA World Cup players
1998 FIFA World Cup players
2002 FIFA World Cup players
2001 FIFA Confederations Cup players
1984 African Cup of Nations players
1988 African Cup of Nations players
1992 African Cup of Nations players
1998 African Cup of Nations players
2002 African Cup of Nations players
Africa Cup of Nations-winning players
Olympic footballers of Cameroon
Footballers at the 1984 Summer Olympics
Cameroonian expatriate footballers
Expatriate footballers in France
Expatriate footballers in Spain
Cameroonian expatriate sportspeople in France
Cameroonian expatriate sportspeople in Spain